Jakarta Slide is an open-source content management system from the Jakarta project. It is written in Java and implements the WebDAV protocol. Slide is a set of APIs to implement the WebDAV client. Thanks to that, Slide can also be seen as a Content Management Framework. The use of WebDAV, which is a superset of HTTP, makes Slide an ideal candidate for web-based content management. Among the applications of Slide are its use as a file server, in intranet applications, and as an excellent repository for XML both as properties and versioned files for persistence of JavaBeans. It also has an extensible storage mechanism that can be used for Integration and adaptation.

The Apache Jakarta PMC has announced the retirement
of the Jakarta Slide subproject at 2007-11-03. An alternative implementation that is actively maintained is the WebDAV component of the Apache Jackrabbit project that provides Java-based content repository software.

External links

Official Slide website at apache.org
Apache Jackrabbit library at apache.org

Free content management systems
Apache Software Foundation
Java platform software
Cross-platform software